Vestia ranojevici is a species of air-breathing land snail, a terrestrial pulmonate gastropod mollusk in the family Clausiliidae, the door snails, all of which have a clausilium.

Subspecies
Subspecies within this species include:
 Vestia ranojevici moravica (Brabenec, 1952)

Distribution
This species occurs in:
 Czech Republic - only the subspecies Vestia ranojevici moravica in Moravia

References

External links

Clausiliidae
Gastropods described in 1912